Stiphodon weberi is a species of goby known only from known from Ambon and Halmahera, Maluku and Yapen Island, Irian Jaya, Indonesia.
  
This species can reach a length of  SL.

References 

weberi
Taxa named by Ronald E. Watson
Taxa named by Gerald R. Allen
Taxa named by Maurice Kottelat
Fish described in 1998